The 1978 Illinois Fighting Illini football team was an American football team that represented the University of Illinois during the 1978 Big Ten Conference football season.  In their second year under head coach Gary Moeller, the Illini compiled a 1–8–2 record and finished in ninth place in the Big Ten Conference.

The team's offensive leaders were quarterback Rich Weiss with 665 passing yards, running back Wayne Strader with 389 rushing yards, and wide receiver Jeff Barnes with 270 receiving yards. Linebacker John Sullivan and center Randy Taylor were selected as the team's most valuable players.

Schedule

References

Illinois
Illinois Fighting Illini football seasons
Illinois Fighting Illini football